The Battle of Langensalza (10 February 1761) was an engagement between French forces and allied Prussian and Hanoverian forces during the Seven Years' War.  It was fought near Langensalza in what is now eastern Germany. An allied advance surprised the French, resulting in the capture of 2,000 French soldiers.

References
Works of Thomas Carlyle: History of Frederick the Great

Conflicts in 1761
Battles of the Seven Years' War
Battles involving France
Battles involving Great Britain
Battles involving Prussia
1761 in the Holy Roman Empire
Battles in Thuringia